Maribel Aguirre (born 15 May 1999) is an Argentine racing cyclist. In 2018, she won the Women's National Road Race Championship in Argentina.

References

1999 births
Living people
Argentine female cyclists
Cyclists at the 2019 Pan American Games
Pan American Games competitors for Argentina
21st-century Argentine women